Shah Qoli may refer to:

 Shah Qoli, Lorestan, Iran
 Shah Qoliabad, Lorestan Province, Iran